Rogier Diederik Marius Verbeek (7 April 1845, Doorn – 9 April 1926, The Hague) was a Dutch geologist and natural scientist.

His journal Krakatau, which was edited in 1884 and 1885 by order of the Governor-General of the Dutch East Indies, is his most known work. It deals with the eruption of the volcanic island Krakatoa in 1883 and brought volcanology into scientific prominence. Just two years before, Verbeek had done research in the area. Living in Buitenzorg on Java, he was a direct witness to the eruption. In the BBC docudrama Krakatoa: The Last Days, he is the protagonist and was portrayed by Kevin McMonagle.

In 1909, he obtained an honorary doctorate of the Delft University of Technology. He was an honorary member of the Koninklijk Nederlands Geologisch Mijnbouwkundig Genootschap and a member of the Maatschappij der Nederlandsche Letterkunde.

Works
The following are some of Verbeek's other writings:
Topographische en geologische Beschrijving van een Deel van Sumatra's Westkust, Batavia, 1883.
Geologische beschrijving van Java en Madoera, Amsterdam, 1896. Written together  with R. Fennema,  by order of the Governor-General of the Dutch East Indies.
De eilanden Alor en Pantar, residentie Timor en onderhoorigheden, Amsterdam, 1914, on behalf of the Koninklijk Nederlands Aardrijkskundig Genootschap. 
De vulkanische erupties in Oost-Java in het laatst der 16de eeuw, Verhandelingen van het Genootschap, 1925.

References

External links 
 Minutes of the annual meeting of the Koninklijk Nederlands Aardrijkskundig Genootschap

20th-century Dutch geologists
Dutch mining engineers
1845 births
1926 deaths
Dutch volcanologists
Krakatoa
People from Doorn
19th-century Dutch geologists
20th-century Dutch engineers
19th-century Dutch engineers